Gyula Rákosi (born 9 October 1938) is a former Hungarian footballer.

During his club career he played for Ferencvárosi TC. He earned 41 caps and scored 4 goals for the Hungary national football team from 1960 to 1968, and participated in the 1962 FIFA World Cup, the 1964 European Nations' Cup, and the 1966 FIFA World Cup. He was in the squad of Ferencvárosi TC that has won the 1964–65 Inter-Cities Fairs Cup. He also won a bronze medal in football at the 1960 Summer Olympics. He finished his career in 1972. Later he worked as a coach, inter alia in the Middle East (Kuwait).

References

External links

Hungary - Record International Players

1938 births
Living people
Hungarian footballers
Hungary international footballers
1962 FIFA World Cup players
1964 European Nations' Cup players
1966 FIFA World Cup players
Ferencvárosi TC footballers
Olympic footballers of Hungary
Footballers at the 1960 Summer Olympics
Olympic bronze medalists for Hungary
Hungarian football managers
Ferencvárosi TC managers
Olympic medalists in football
FC Tatabánya managers
Medalists at the 1960 Summer Olympics
Footballers from Budapest
Association football midfielders